The Power of Darkness (German:Die Macht der Finsternis) is a 1924 German silent drama film directed by Conrad Wiene and starring Petr Sharov, Mariya Germanova and Maria Kryshanovskaya. It is an adaptation of Leo Tolstoy's play The Power of Darkness.

It was shot at the Bavaria Studios in Munich.

Cast
 Petr Sharov 
 Mariya Germanova - Anisia 
 Maria Kryshanovskaya - Aniuta 
 Alexander Wiruboff - Nikita 
 Pavel Pavlov - Akim 
 Maria Egorowa - Akulina 
 Sergej Kommissarov   
 Nikolai Massalitinov  
 Vera Orlova   
 Vera Pawlowa   
 George Seroff

References

Bibliography
 Jung, Uli & Schatzberg, Walter. Beyond Caligari: The Films of Robert Wiene. Berghahn Books, 1999.

External links

Films of the Weimar Republic
1924 films
German silent feature films
German drama films
Films directed by Conrad Wiene
German films based on plays
1924 drama films
German black-and-white films
Bavaria Film films
Films shot at Bavaria Studios
Silent drama films
1920s German films
1920s German-language films